Michalis Bakakis (born 18 March 1991) is a Greek professional footballer who plays as a right-back for Super League club Panetolikos.

Club career

Early career
Born on 18 March 1991 in Agrinio, Bakakis began his career with local side Panetolikos. His first professional appearance was a win match against Fokikos on 21 January 2009. In the summer of 2011 he transferred to Chania.  He returned to Panetolikos on 31 July 2012.

AEK Athens
On 15 April 2014, AEK Athens announced the agreement with the player for a 4-years' contract. In February 2015, shortly before the crucial match against Olympiacos for the Greek Cup, Bakakis stated that "We must be determined, passionate and concentrated. First of all we want to win the Football League title, so that AEK will return where they belong. But we are interested in the Greek Cup as well. It would be a dream come true if we manage to win both." On 20 May 2015, in a home match against Olympiacos Volos he suffered a cruciate rupture, which left him out of the pitch for 6 months.

The 26-year-old right back's contract had been due to expire in the summer of 2017 but that has now been stretched to 2019 by his club. Bakakis always had the desire to remain at AEK Athens and he was more than happy to commit his future to the club for the next two years.

On 12 April 2017, Bakakis agreed to a contract extension with AEK, until the summer of 2020.

At the start of the 2017–18 season he switched his number from 27 to 2. On 25 July 2017, he made his debut in the Champions League in a 2–0 home loss against CSKA Moscow for the third qualifying round. On 23 February 2018, Bakakis was included in Europa League's Team of the Week for his performance in a 0–0 away draw against Dynamo Kyiv. The 27-year-old defender has been in excellent form for experienced Spanish manager Manolo Jimenez's team during 2017–18 season, playing mainly as central or left defender even if his natural position is at the right place of the defensive line.

On 29 August 2018, Bakakis agreed to a contract extension with AEK, until the summer of 2023. On 10 November 2019, the 28-year-old Greek international scored only the third goal of his AEK career, and his first strike in four-and-a-half years when he let fly from the edge of the box with a powerful shot which left Sokratis Dioudis no chance, in a devastating 3–2 away loss against Panathinaikos.

On 31 March 2021, AEK will be deprived of the services of Michalis Bakakis, as the Greek back was injured in a national match against Georgia,
as it confirmed the assessment that the tendon in his right leg has been affected. Eventually the international back has suffered a partial tendon rupture and will be out of action for at least two weeks. It is the third injury of Bakakis in 2021.

On the beginning of November 2021, Michalis Bakakis has been put at the disposal of coach Sokratis Ofrydopoulos for AEK Athens B F.C., in order to find a competitive rhythm from the moment he has not had a match with the first team until today, but also to help the youngsters of the second team. On 29 July 2021, the match that AEK excluded from the UEFA Conference League, was probably the last appearance until today of Michalis Bakakis with the jersey of the club. With Vladan Milojević, was almost excluded, but since the arrival of new coach Argirios Giannikis, the international defender has been informed that he is no longer considered as a member of the club, and that he can look for the next stage of his career.

International career
He has represented Greece at U-19 level. Bakakis' debut with the Greece came against Serbia, replacing Vasilis Torosidis in November 2014.

Career statistics

Club

Notes

A.  Includes appearances in the UEFA Champions League and UEFA Europa League.
B.  Includes appearances in the Superleague Greece play-offs.

Honours
AEK Athens
Super League Greece: 2017–18
Super League Greece 2: 2014–15 (South Group)
Greek Cup: 2015–16

References

External links

1991 births
Living people
Greek footballers
Greece international footballers
Greece youth international footballers
Super League Greece players
Football League (Greece) players
Super League Greece 2 players
Panetolikos F.C. players
AO Chania F.C. players
AEK Athens F.C. players
AEK Athens F.C. B players
Association football fullbacks
Footballers from Agrinio